"Now and Then" is an alternative rock song performed by Australian band The Superjesus. The song was released in March 1998  as the third single from the band's debut studio album, Sumo (1998). The song peaked at number 40 on the Australian ARIA Singles Chart. 

In January 1999, The song was ranked at number 83 in the Triple J Hottest 100, 1998.

Track listing
CD Single (3984229822)
 "Now and Then" - 4:05
 "Down Again"  (Live from Triple J rooftop)  - 5:20
 "Spike the Guns"  (Live From The Falls Festival, Lorne) - 3:06
 "Saturation"  (Demo)  - 3:56

Charts

References

1998 singles
1998 songs
Songs written by Sarah McLeod (musician)
Warner Records singles
The Superjesus songs